Shamrock Farms is a dairy company in Phoenix, Arizona, United States. Its mascot is a cow named "Roxie."

Founded in 1922, Shamrock Farms is the largest family-owned and operated dairy in the Southwest. It produces and distributes a full line of dairy products. It is owned by the McClelland family.

Mmmmilk brand 
Mmmmilk is a well known milk brand distributed by Shamrock Farms in the Southwestern United States. The milk brand is produced in Arizona. Shamrock Farms sponsors the Arizona Diamondbacks, and some of their bottles have featured Diamondback players such as Mark Grace and Luis Gonzalez. Shamrock Foods also provides commercial foodservice.

Shamrock Mmmmilks are made in the following flavors:

Mmmmilk
Whole White
2% Reduced Fat White
1% Low Fat White
Fat Free Plus Calcium White
Vanilla (2%)
Chocolate (2%, Whole)
Strawberry (2%)
No Sugar Added 1% Chocolate
Orange Cream

Cold Brew Coffee and Milk:
Original
Vanilla
Moch

See also
 List of dairy product companies in the United States

References

External links
Shamrock Farms website

Dairy products companies of the United States
Manufacturing companies based in Phoenix, Arizona